Whiplash may refer to:

 The long flexible part of a whip
 Whiplash (medicine), a neck injury
 Whiplash Injury Protection System (WHIPS), in automobiles

Film and television
 Whiplash (1948 film), a US film noir about a boxer
 Whiplash (1959 film), another name for Fiend of Dope Island, a lurid adventure film
Whiplash, a 2002 film starring Ernest Borgnine and Bradley Gregg
 Whiplash (2013 film), a short film about a jazz drummer and his instructor, directed by Damien Chazelle, starring Johnny Simmons and J. K. Simmons
 Whiplash (2014 film), a feature film about a jazz drummer and his instructor, directed by Damien Chazelle, starring Miles Teller and J. K. Simmons
 Whiplash (TV series), Australia, 1960s drama set during the 1850s gold rushes
 An event in the Australian TV series Gladiators

Episodes
 "Whiplash" (Beavis and Butt-head)
 "Whiplash" (Iron Man: Armored Adventures)
 "Whiplash" (Law & Order)
 "Whiplash" (The Unit)

Music
"Whiplash" by Hank Levy, recorded by Don Ellis on the album Soaring, 1973
Whiplash (band), an American thrash metal band
Whiplash (album), by James
"Whiplash" (Metallica song), 1983
"Whiplash" (Stellar song), 2006
"Whiplash" by NCT 127 from Cherry Bomb, 2017
"Whiplash" by FEMM from Femm-Isation, 2014
"Whiplash" by Selena Gomez & the Scene from When the Sun Goes Down, 2011
"Whiplash", song by The Boyz from  Chase, 2020

Fictional characters
 Whiplash (Marvel Comics), several villains
 Whiplash (Masters of the Universe)
 Snidely Whiplash, from the Dudley Do-Right cartoons

Video games
 Whiplash (video game), a 2003 platform game
 Fatal Racing or Whiplash, a 1995 racing game

Other uses
 Whiplash (magazine) (Voorslag), a South African literary magazine
 Whiplash (wrestling), a neckbreaker-type move in professional wrestling
 Whiplash the Cowboy Monkey, a capuchin monkey known for riding a dog
 Whiplash Glacier, Antarctica
 Miss Whiplash, Lindi St Clair (born 1952), British prostitute, activist and author